Subjects of Desire is a Canadian documentary film, directed by Jennifer Holness and released in 2021. Nominally jumping off from the 50th anniversary of the Miss Black America pageant in 2018, the film is an exploration of the relationship between African-American and Black Canadian society with the broader cultural concept of beauty standards.

Figures appearing in the film include India Arie, Jully Black, Rachel Dolezal, Alexandra Germain, Brittany Lee Lewis, Seraiah Nicole, Ryann Richardson, Cheryl Thompson, Carolyn West and Heather Widdows.

The film premiered on the online platform of the SXSW festival on March 12, 2021, and had its Canadian premiere at the Hot Docs Canadian International Documentary Festival in April.

The film was nominated for the Directors Guild of Canada's DGC Discovery Award in 2021, and was named to the Toronto International Film Festival's annual year-end Canada's Top Ten list.

References

External links
 
 Subjects of Desire at Library and Archives Canada

2021 films
2021 documentary films
Canadian documentary films
Documentary films about Black Canadians
2020s English-language films
2020s Canadian films